Life, Love & the Blues is the twenty-first studio album by Etta James, released in 1998. The album reached a peak position of number three on Billboard Top Blues Albums chart.

Track listing

Personnel
Etta James - vocals
Leo Nocentelli, Bobby Murray - guitar
Josh Sklair - guitar, dobro
Sametto James - bass
David K. Mathews - keyboards
Mike Finnigan - Hammond B-3 organ
Donto Mento James - drums, percussion
Jimmy Z - saxophone, harmonica
Lee Thornburg - trumpet, valve trombone
Tom Poole - trumpet

References

1998 albums
Etta James albums
Private Music albums